Gabrielle and the Doodleman is a children's film, that was released in 1984 and directed and written by Francis Essex. It was produced by the Elstree (Production) Company Ltd for the Children's Film Foundation (at that time renamed the Children's Film and Television Foundation).

Premise
The story is about Gabrielle, a girl who uses a wheelchair. Gabrielle gets involved in a life and death battle with characters from her computer game (she can be seen playing "Space Invaders" at the beginning of the film), and in particular "Doodleman", that help her through a difficult time. Matthew Kelly played a James Bond like character "Doodleman", with Eric Sykes as the Genie, Windsor Davies as the characters Ringmaster, Black Knight and an Ugly Sister. Prudence Oliver played the main character Gabrielle and Anna Dawson played the Wicked Witch. Singer-songwriter Lynsey de Paul, played the characters Miss Moneypocket (a Miss Moneypenny type character) and Dandini. Gareth Hunt played Mike as well as the King and Baron Hardup. Comedienne Josephine Tewson played Mrs. Briggs and the Fairy Godmother. Bob Todd (real name Brian Todd) was Merlin as well as an Ugly Sister and Pierre Picton, the last surviving clown from Bertram Mills Circus, played the Clown.

Production
De Paul wrote and performed the fitting, electronic-tinged, theme tune "You're Alright as You Are" which was performed by Matthew Kelly and she composed, arranged and played all the music that is featured in the film.

The producer was Greg Smith and the associate producer was Roy Goddard. The budget was £202,097.

Release
It was released on VHS video and it was shown on U.K. terrestrial TV network for the first time on ITV on 30 December 1988. The TV Times review called the film "a junior version of Tron. It was also released in Norway as "elle melle... Gabrielle". The film is described as "a familiar piece of whimsy with a striking supporting cast" by Robert Shail in his book "The Children's Film Foundation: History and Legacy".

References

1984 films
British children's films
1980s children's films
1980s British films